SA Home Loans is a mortgage finance company and mortgage insurance provider in South Africa. It was founded in February 1999 and is headquartered in uMhlanga, South Africa near the city of Durban.  Its services cover origination and credit approval through to registration and ongoing loan servicing.

SA Home Loans is an independent, non-bank home loans provider that has played a pioneering role in creating a more diverse financial infrastructure in South Africa (SA).  

From a modest start-up operation opening for business in 1999, SA Home Loans (Pty) Ltd (SAHL) has flourished in the midst of powerfully entrenched competition and global financial turmoil.  It has become SA’s 5th largest – and largest non-bank – home loan provider.   After more than 20 years it is solidly established with a strong and recognisable local brand, servicing a sizable mortgage portfolio – having originated in excess of R140 billion (approx. US$10 billion) and enabled home ownership to more than 300,000 clients since inception.

As a non-bank home loan provider, SAHL pioneered new techniques for raising funding from the South African markets to fund its loan portfolios (securitisation). 

As a specialist home loan provider, its operations cover the full spectrum of home financing: from its own sales force for origination, in-house credit structures, through to ongoing client and loan servicing and related insurance products.

SA Home Loans has also recorded high sale and clients in the last year and even currently. Randomtalks, a Financial organization, noted that, they are not passionate about making reckless lending meaning that they are not a loan shark organization

References

External links
 SA Home Loans website
 SA Home Loans Facebook page

Financial services companies of South Africa
Companies based in KwaZulu-Natal
eThekwini Metropolitan Municipality